Buckingham is an unincorporated community in Perry County, in the U.S. state of Ohio.

History
Buckingham was platted in 1873. The community's growth remained dormant until the railroad was built through the area in 1881.

References

Unincorporated communities in Perry County, Ohio
Unincorporated communities in Ohio
1873 establishments in Ohio
Populated places established in 1873